Lambert Straatman (14 October 1802 - 18 April 1888) was a ship-owner from Brussels. Born in Bergen op Zoom, he moved to Brussels around 1826 and became a naturalised Belgian citizen in 1841.

Notes and references

Further reading 
 Jacques Dubreucq, Bruxelles, une histoire capitale, volume 4, la Section du Canal, Brussels, p. 239 et 240.
 Éliane Gubin, Bruxelles au XIXe siècle: berceau d’un flamingantisme démocratique (1840-1873), Brussels, 1979, p. 139 et 490.
 Biographie Nationale de Belgique, Lambert Straatman is cited in the entry of Charles-François Stallaert.
 Jaarboek des Koninklijke Vlaamsche Akademie, 1895, p. 86–87.
 Ginette Kurgan-van Hentenryk et alii, Dictionnaire des Patrons en Belgique, Brussels, De Boeck, 1996, p. 265.
 Thierry Scaillet, La Société Royale de Philanthropie. Histoire d'une institution au service des aveugles et des démunis, Brussels, 2011, p. 268.
 Anthony Peter Swallow et Michel P. Vanwelkenhuyzen, Décès français à Bruxelles-ville (1821-1830), Brussels, s. d., sub verbo, Fautier.
 Table décennale alphabétique des pièces imprimées par ordre de la Chambre des Représentants, Brussels, Hayez, 1851, Straatman, Lambert, Naturalisation (no 221, 1841–42), p. 171.
 Baudouin Walckiers, Filiations lignagères contemporaines, Brussels, 1999 (See: descendance van Dievoet-Straatman).
 André de Walque, Straatman, in Le Parchemin, bulletin of the Genealogical and Heraldic Office of Belgium, January–February 1990, no 265, p. 76.
 Sophie Fautier, Le livre de raison de Sophie Fautier, continué jusqu'à nos jours par un de ses descendants, Brussels, 1988.

Businesspeople from Brussels
1802 births
1888 deaths